The 2021 Boar's Head Resort Women's Open was a professional women's tennis tournament played on outdoor clay courts. It was the nineteenth edition of the tournament which was part of the 2021 ITF Women's World Tennis Tour. It took place in Charlottesville, Virginia, United States between 26 April and 2 May 2021.

Singles main-draw entrants

Seeds

 1 Rankings are as of 19 April 2021.

Other entrants
The following players received wildcards into the singles main draw:
  Emma Navarro
  Alycia Parks
  Katie Volynets

The following players received entry from the qualifying draw:
  Katie Boulter
  Hanna Chang
  Ulrikke Eikeri
  Arianne Hartono
  Jamie Loeb
  Maria Mateas
  Grace Min
  Aldila Sutjiadi

Champions

Singles

 Claire Liu def.  Wang Xinyu, 3–6, 6–4, 4–1, ret.

Doubles

 Anna Danilina /  Arina Rodionova def.  Erin Routliffe /  Aldila Sutjiadi, 6–1, 6–3

References

External links
 2021 Boar's Head Resort Women's Open at ITFtennis.com
 Official website

2021 ITF Women's World Tennis Tour
2021 in American tennis
April 2021 sports events in the United States
May 2021 sports events in the United States
Tennis in Virginia